The Tax Relief and Health Care Act of 2006, includes a package of tax extenders, provisions affecting health savings accounts and other provisions in the United States.

Tax provisions

Extenders

The Act retroactively extended for two years (through December 31, 2007) certain provisions that had expired at the end of 2005, including:

 Above the line deduction for qualified tuition and higher education expenses
 Elective itemized deduction for state and local general sales taxes (in lieu of a deduction for state and local income taxes)
 Research credit
 For tax years ending after December 31, 2006, the Act also modifies the rules for calculating the research credit: it increases the rates of the alternative incremental credit and creates a new alternative simplified credit
 Work opportunity tax credit, welfare-to-work tax credit
 Tax credit for Qualified Zone Academy Bonds
 Up to $250 above-the-line deduction for certain expenses of elementary and secondary school teachers
 Expensing of brownfields remediation costs
 Tax incentives for investment in Washington, DC
 Indian employment tax credit
 Accelerated depreciation for business property on Indian reservations
 Fifteen-year depreciation for qualified leasehold improvements and qualified restaurant property
 Enhanced charitable deductions—for corporate donations of scientific property used for research, and of computer technology and equipment
 Archer medical savings accounts
 Suspension of the taxable income limit on percentage depletion for oil and natural gas produced from marginal properties

In addition, the Act extended (through December 31, 2007) certain provisions that would otherwise expire at the end of 2006, including:

 Election to treat combat pay as earned income for purposes of calculating the earned income credit
 Provisions affecting IRS disclosure of certain tax return information

The Act extended the new markets tax credit through the end of 2008 and requires that future regulations ensure that non-metropolitan counties receive a proportional allocation of qualified entity investments.

The Act extended through December 31, 2008, numerous energy provisions that would otherwise have expired at the end of 2007, including:

 Tax credit for electricity produced from certain renewable resources
 Authority to issue clean renewable energy bonds
 Deduction for energy-efficient commercial buildings
 Tax credit for new energy-efficient homes
 Tax credit for residential energy-efficient property

Health savings account provisions

Several provisions affect health savings accounts (HSAs), including provisions dealing with limitations on HSA contributions and tax-free rollovers to HSAs from health reimbursement accounts, flexible spending accounts and individual retirement accounts.

Other provisions

Other provisions include:

 Expansion of the Section 199 domestic production activity deduction to income from Puerto Rico, if all Puerto Rican receipts are subject to federal income tax
 A refundable credit of 20 percent of the long-term unused alternative minimum tax credits per year for the next five years, subject to certain limitations and phaseouts
 Enhancing reporting requirements for the exercise of incentive stock options and employee stock purchase plans
 Reform and expansion of whistleblower awards to certain individuals who provide information regarding violations of the tax laws
 An increase of the penalty for frivolous tax submissions from $500 to $5,000 and an extension of the scope of the penalty
 A temporary itemized deduction for qualified mortgage insurance premiums accrued during 2007, subject to limitations and phase-out
 Increased information sharing between the IRS and certain regional governmental organizations
 Charitable remainder trusts having unrelated business taxable income are subjected to an excise tax equal to 100% of unrelated business taxable income
 A technical correction to the Subpart F look-through rule under the Tax Increase Prevention and Reconciliation Act of 2005
 Clarifying that the Tax Court has jurisdiction to review requests for equitable innocent spouse relief
 Expanding the Medicare Recovery Audit Contractor program to all 50 states and making it permanent
 Ordering the completion without delay of the All-American Canal Lining Project and identifying a 1944 treaty between the US and Mexico as the exclusive authority concerning the impacts of projects constructed within US territory on foreign territories

The Act makes permanent certain provisions that were included as temporary provisions in the Tax Increase Prevention and Reconciliation Act of 2005 and were otherwise scheduled to expire after 2010, including:

 Federal income tax exemption of certain qualified settlement funds established to resolve CERCLA claims
 "Separate affiliated group" rule for satisfaction of active trade or business requirement under Section 355
 Election to treat self-created musical works as capital assets
 Exemption from imputed interest rules for certain loans to qualified continuing care facilities

References

CRS Report in the public domain

External links
 , Legislative History

United States federal taxation legislation
United States federal health legislation
Acts of the 109th United States Congress